Dinara Talhatauna Alimbekava ( born 5 January 1996) is a Kazakhstan-born Belarusian biathlete. She won a gold medal in the 4×6 km relay at the 2018 Olympics. Alimbekava won her first IBU World Cup competition (a sprint) in Hochfilzen, Austria, in December 2020, and finished as the Under-25 Cup leader for the 2020-21 World Cup season.

Alimbekava was born in Kazakhstan to a Kazakh father and a Belarusian mother. When she was three years old, her family moved to Belarus, where her younger brother Zhenya was born. Dzinara is professionally trained in piano and skates and practices snowboarding in her free time. In October 2022, Alimbekava revealed via her Instagram account that she had married fellow biathlete Anton Smolski on January 10th of that same year.

Biathlon results
All results are sourced from the International Biathlon Union.

Olympic Games
1 medal (1 gold)

World Championships
0 medals

*During Olympic seasons competitions are only held for those events not included in the Olympic program.
**The single mixed relay was added as an event in 2019.

World Cup

Individual podiums
 1 victories (1 Sp) 
 6 podiums (1 Sp, 3 Pu, 2 Ms)

References

1996 births
Living people
Biathletes at the 2018 Winter Olympics
Biathletes at the 2022 Winter Olympics
Belarusian female biathletes
Olympic biathletes of Belarus
Olympic gold medalists for Belarus
Olympic medalists in biathlon
Medalists at the 2018 Winter Olympics
People from Abay District, East Kazakhstan
Kazakhstani emigrants to Belarus